Helen Douglas Mankin (September 11, 1896 – July 25, 1956) was an American politician. She was the second woman to represent Georgia in the United States House of Representatives.

Life 
Mankin was born September 11, 1896, in Atlanta, Fulton County, Georgia.  She grew up there, attending public and private schools. She graduated with an A.B. from Rockford College, Rockford, Illinois, in 1917. She graduated with an LL.B. from Atlanta Law School, Atlanta, Georgia, in 1920. During and after the First World War, Mankin served as an ambulance driver in the American Women's Hospital Unit No. 1,  a Red Cross unit attached to the French army in 1918 and 1919. She was there as a civilian and was not officially a military veteran.

After the war and earning her law degree, Mankin entered private practice as an attorney in Atlanta, Georgia. She entered politics, and served as a Democratic member of the Georgia House of Representatives from 1937 until 1946.

In 1946, Mankin was elected as a Democrat to represent the fifth congressional district of Georgia in the 79th United States Congress, filling the seat left vacant by the resignation of Robert Ramspeck. She took her seat February 12, 1946. She was an unsuccessful candidate in that year's Democratic Party primary election when she sought renomination to run for reelection. She won the popular vote, gaining major support from Atlanta's African-American community, but lost in the county unit system, a voting system similar to the presidential electoral college that Georgia then used for primary elections. The county-unit system gave disproportionate weight to the votes of rural counties, severely discounting the votes of large urban areas, such as Atlanta's Fulton County. Mankin then was an unsuccessful write-in candidate in the general election of 1946.

Mankin's term of office concluded January 3, 1947. She continued to live in Atlanta, and she died there on July 25, 1956.

See also
 Women in the United States House of Representatives

References

Spritzer, Lorraine Nelson.  The Belle of Ashby Street:  Helen Douglas Mankin and Georgia Politics.  Athens:  The University of Georgia Press, 1982.
 MANKIN, Helen Douglas, Office of the Historian: Office of Art & Archives, Office of the Clerk
 Helen Douglas Mankin (1894-1956), ''New Georgia Encyclopedia

1896 births
1956 deaths
Georgia (U.S. state) lawyers
Politicians from Atlanta
Atlanta Law School alumni
American Red Cross personnel
Rockford University alumni
Female members of the United States House of Representatives
Women state legislators in Georgia (U.S. state)
Democratic Party members of the Georgia House of Representatives
Women in Georgia (U.S. state) politics
Democratic Party members of the United States House of Representatives from Georgia (U.S. state)
20th-century American politicians
20th-century American women politicians
20th-century American lawyers